Dactyloceras murphyi is a moth in the family Brahmaeidae. It was described by Thierry Bouyer in 2012. It is found in Malawi.

References

Brahmaeidae
Moths described in 2012
Endemic fauna of Malawi
Moths of Africa